The Garden festival is an annual summer dance music festival held in the area around Šibenik, Croatia each July. Started in 2006, the festival is held outdoors on the beach-front terrace, contributing to the open and relaxed party atmosphere that has become synonymous with the festival.

2006 festival
Live acts included: Alice Russell, Bass Culture, Dub Specimen, Eddy meets Yannah, Overproof, Reel People, The Beat Fleet, Different Drummer, Montefiori Cocktail and Alice McLaughlin.

2007 festival 
Live acts included: 6IX TOY'S, Alice McLaughlin, Crazy P, Cubismo, Diesler, No Fakin DJs, Overproof Sound System, Postolar Tripper, Soil and Pimp Sessions and Yesking.

2008 festival

2009 festival

2010 festival

2011 festival

2012 festival

References

External links

 official website of Taxi in Tisno
 Accommodation in Tisno

Dance festivals in Croatia
Music festivals in Croatia
Electronic music festivals in Croatia
Recurring events established in 2006
2006 establishments in Croatia
Festivals established in 2006
Summer events in Croatia